Starosurmetovo (İśke Sörmät) is a rural locality (a selo) in Chekmagushevsky District, Bashkortostan, Russia. The population was 7 as of 2010. There is 1 street.

Geography 
Starosurmetovo is located 29 km southwest of Chekmagush (the district's administrative centre) by road. Yana Birde is the nearest rural locality.

References 

Rural localities in Chekmagushevsky District